Jōhoku Station is a HRT station on Astram Line, located in 25–80, Nishi-hakushima, Naka-ku, Hiroshima.

Platforms

Connections
█ Astram Line
●Kenchō-mae — ●Jōhoku — Shin-Hakushima

Around station
Hiroshima Castle
Hiroshima Municipal Hiroshima Motomachi High School
Hiroshima Central Park (Chūō Koen)

History
Opened on August 20, 1994.

See also
Astram Line
Hiroshima Rapid Transit

References

Astram Line stations
Railway stations in Japan opened in 1994